Blaxter is a surname. Notable people with the surname include:

Kenneth Blaxter (disambiguation), multiple people
Mildred Blaxter (1925–2010), British sociologist and writer
Blaxter family, owners of Badenyon

See also
Baxter (name)
Blaxterr Freestone, see Russell Institute